Camille of the Barbary Coast is a 1925 American silent drama film directed by Hugh Dierker that starred Mae Busch, Owen Moore, and Fritzi Brunette.

Plot
As described in a film magazine reviews, Bob  Norton, thoroughly soured on humanity in general, has just left the penitentiary where he served a two-year sentence for larceny, following his wealthy father’s refusal to help  him. Dejected, and with only four of the ten dollars given him on his release left, he wanders into a Barbary Coast dance hall and meets Camille. His sportsmanship in parting with his last dollar for a bottle of wine for her appeals to the girl. She tries to help him, but her insistence upon lending him money is of no avail, but she succeeds in forcing him to allow her to provide a place for him to sleep until he finds work. All her best instincts come to the surface in mothering him, at the same time working out her own salvation, and making a real man of him. The father, Henry Norton, has been secretly watching his son’s regeneration and accepts the young woman at her true worth as his son’s wife.

Cast

References

Bibliography
 Munden, Kenneth White. The American Film Institute Catalog of Motion Pictures Produced in the United States, Part 1. University of California Press, 1997.

External links

1925 films
1925 drama films
Silent American drama films
Films directed by Hugh Dierker
American silent feature films
1920s English-language films
American black-and-white films
Films set in San Francisco
Associated Exhibitors films
1920s American films